State Route 113 (SR 113) is a  state highway in Escambia County in the southern part of the U.S. state of Alabama. The southern terminus of the highway is at the Florida state line, where U.S. Route 29 (US 29) enters Flomaton, Alabama from Century, Florida. The northern terminus of the highway is at an interchange with Interstate 65 (I-65) near Barnett Crossroads in the north-central part of the county.

Route description
The first reassurance marker for SR 113 appears along US 29 just north of the Florida state line. East of Flomaton, SR 113 diverts from US 29/US 31 and leads motorists towards its terminus at I-65.

SR 113 is one of several highways that connect with US 29, which heads to Pensacola, Florida and the beaches along the Florida Panhandle on the Gulf of Mexico.

Future
SR 113 is a major evacuation route for residents of the Pensacola metropolitan area seeking to flee incoming hurricanes. As such, Alabama is currently planning to widen the highway to a four-lane divided highway status from Flomaton to I-65. Though the road is in Alabama, neighboring Escambia County, Florida has agreed to contribute $4 million to the project due to the benefits the widened road will provide to its citizens.

On November 12, 2008, Gov. Bob Riley and Alabama Transportation Director Joe McInnes cut the ribbon opening up the new , four-lane highway. The project opened a month ahead of schedule.

Not only does the new project make it safer and more efficient for evacuations from hurricanes, officials hope that the improved roadway will help bolster economic development opportunities for the coastal region.

Major intersections

See also

References

113
Transportation in Escambia County, Alabama